The jewel-babblers are the bird genus Ptilorrhoa in the family Cinclosomatidae. The genus contains four species that are endemic to New Guinea. The genus was once considered to contain the rail-babbler, but that species is now considered to belong to its own family. The genus is closely related to the better known quail-thrushes (Cinclosoma) of New Guinea and Australia. Together with a number of other genera they comprise the family Cinclosomatidae, although the validity of this family as a whole has been questioned.

The jewel-babblers resemble the quail-thrushes in shape, being plump, long-tailed and short winged. They are adapted to life on the forest floor. The plumage of this genus is the most striking divergence from the quail-thrushes, having large amounts of blue and often with chestnut on the back. The throats of all species are white and the patch is mostly surrounded by a black edge. There is moderate levels of sexual dimorphism in the plumage, except in the dimorphic jewel-babbler where the female has no blue and is all chestnut coloured. When moving they hold the body horizontally to the ground, and bob their heads back and forth in a similar fashion to pigeons, and move their tail in a fashion similar to wagtails.

The jewel-babblers as a whole are not a well known or studied genus.

It contains the following species:

References

 Del Hoyo, J.; Elliot, A. & Christie D. (editors). (2007). Handbook of the Birds of the World. Volume 12: Picathartes to Tits and Chickadees. Lynx Edicions. 

Cinclosomatidae
 
 
Birds described in 1940
Taxonomy articles created by Polbot